Dunn's River Falls is a famous waterfall near Ocho Rios, Jamaica and a major Caribbean tourist attraction that receives thousands of visitors each year.

Appearance
Several small lagoons are interspersed among the vertical sections of the falls.

The falls empty into the Caribbean Sea at the western end of a white-sand beach.

Tourism
Climbing the waterfalls is a popular tourist activity and is often, but not exclusively, performed with the help of tour guides from the park. It takes about 1-1.5 hours to climb with short breaks for photographs and video recordings taken by the guides. There are also stairs alongside of the falls for those who do not want to get wet or are unable to manage the rocky, uneven terrain of the actual waterfall.

The falls are bordered by lush, green vegetation that shades the area from the sun and keeps the area, and climbers, cool. The climb can be relatively hard so is often undertaken as a hand-holding human chain led by a guide to make it easier.

History

The falls were the location where the Battle of Las Chorreras took place in 1657, when the British defeated a Spanish expeditionary force from Cuba. A plaque placed at the bottom of the falls by the Jamaican Historical Society commemorates the event (see photo).

Geology

Dunn's River, a short stream dropping only  from its source to the sea, is fed by spring water rich with calcium carbonate and deposits travertine forming a sequence of tufa terraces. Such waterfalls are described by geologists as "a living phenomenon" because they are continuously rebuilt by the sediments in spring water.

Dunn's River Falls is one of the very few travertine waterfalls in the world that empties directly into the sea.

References

Waterfalls of Jamaica
Geography of Saint Ann Parish
Tourist attractions in Saint Ann Parish